Amanda Heng Liang Ngim (born 1951) is a contemporary artist, curator and speaker from Singapore, who works in Singapore and internationally. As an artist she has a multidisciplinary practice, working collaboratively in contemporary art exhibitions, performance, forums, workshops and art interventions. Her practice explores themes of national identity, collective memory and social relationships, gender politics and other social issues in urban, contemporary Singaporean society. She is the recipient of the 2019 Singapore Biennale's Benesse Prize.

Background
Heng was born in Singapore in 1951. She graduated from LASALLE College of the Arts with a Diploma in printmaking. In Singapore she helped to establish The Artists Village, the first artist-run space in Singapore. 
In 1988, she then went on to pursue her further studies in art at London, at the Central St Martins School of Art and Design, which is now under the University of the Arts London which she attained her Bachelor of Arts. Amanda has lectured in Nanyang Technology University and the National Institute of Education. She also supervises MA students in LaSalle College of the Arts. She sat on the selection and curatorial committee for the President's Young Talents Exhibition 2009 in Singapore. In 2010, she was presented with the Cultural Medallion and had her first solo retrospective show at the Singapore Art Museum (SAM) in 2011, titled "Amanda Heng: Speak To Me, Walk With Me". In 2014 Heng appeared in the TV series A Journey Through Asian Art.

Feminist work
Heng introduced feminist discourse to the local art scene with provocative performance works that discussed gender inequality and social identity. This was despite performance art gaining notoriety in 1994, following a performance by Josef Ng, in which he snipped his pubic hair at the 5th Passage art space at Parkway Parade Shopping Centre. Following the outcry, the National Arts Council of Singapore suspended all funding for performance art. When Amanda moved into the NAC's newly converted studios in 1997, she was asked to sign an agreement that she would not use the studio for performance.

Despite the circumstances, Amanda formed the collective, Women in the Arts (WITA) in 1999, whose main aim was to advance the feminist art movement, using her studio as a venue for performances and other media. WITA was the first artists-run women's collective in Singapore, and organised forums such as Women And Their Arts, The 1st Asian Film Appreciation workshop, Women About Women, Memories of Sense, TheFridayEvent, Exchange 05 and Open Ends. WITA currently holds an archive of women in the Arts in Singapore.

Heng's work sought to instigate conversations regarding the artistic practices of women, at a time where a feminist field or framework did not exist in Singapore.

Her other art activities include co-directing theatre production "Bernard's Story", and performed in the theatre production "A Woman On the Tree in the Hill" directed by Ivan Heng of The Wild Rice Theatre Company.

Notable artworks

 She and Her Dishcover (1991) - an installation with a table, table cover, mirror and dish cover. Heng examines the words "dishcover" and "discover", while focusing on the preconceived role of women in the domestic sphere.
 Missing (1994) - installation in response to female infanticide in cultures where male offspring was valued above females. The installation consisted of a number baby girls' dresses, hung with fishing lines, hooks, black cloths, together with a black sofa, table, doorframe. This work enacted a commemoration of nameless female babies who are victims of this practice, and also attempted to examine the gender issues within the Asian context "where baby girls are frowned upon, and wives are pressured to produce a male heir for the family." The installation invited the audience to take with them notes containing the artist's thoughts, which were attached to the red strings.
 S/HE (1994) - performance work which focused on questioning the role of being a woman within the cultural and political context of Singapore. Heng explored how power was embedded within influences that continuously encroached upon personal identity. This performance consisted of the artist making symbolic marks on her face, speaking the questions and Confucius sayings in front of a mirror to perform the deconstruction of language to its simplest phonemes and strokes, breaking down meaning to find new ways of expression. The artist also frequently used domestic objects such as baking dough, washing detergent, toy alphabets, and the audience was seated and stood around the performance space. S/He was performed again in 1995 and 1996, with developments in the performance, with the artist appropriating language, text, symbols, images, memories, Chinese classical music and Western choral singing.
 Tiger Balls, Myths and Chinese Man (1991) - installation consisting of basketballs painting with tiger stripes and laid out on a traditional Chinese wedding blanket. The artist, during a media tour of her work, stated that it was made in response to a sexist comment made about women, following fellow contemporary artist Tang Da Wu's installation, "Tiger's Whip" in 1991. Tang's installation depicted the practice of Chinese men eating tiger penises as an aphrodisiac, which evoked the comment that this problem was due to women's expectations.
 Let's Chat (1996) - a performance piece that invited members of the public to sit and chat at a table with her, while drinking tea and cleaning bean sprouts together, which referenced the simpler lifestyle associated with old kampong life. This work was presented first at Substation, then at local shopping malls and markets, and to different communities overseas.
 Another Woman (1996–1997) - a photography and mixed-media installation, created by Heng in collaboration with her mother that highlighted the sense of displacement dialect-speaking, kampong-bred women such as her mother suffered as a consequence of "nation-building", and her diminishing social identity as "another woman. This work was shown at The First Fukuoka Asian Triennial in 1999. The work features in episode two of the TV series A Journey Through Asian Art.
 Let's Walk (1999) - a series of street performances that response to the survival of beauty businesses during the 1997 Asian financial crisis. The performance saw Amanda and members of the public walking backwards with high-heeled shoes in their mouths, using handheld mirrors to guide themselves. These performances were presented in Singapore, Japan, Paris, Poland, Indonesia, Sweden and Spain.
 Yours Truly, My Body (1999) - this work shows the artist scrubbing a slab of pig meat with blood to comment on the pain women undergo to beautify themselves through cosmetic surgery.
 Narrating Bodies (1999–2000) - an installation and performance using old and new photos and reconstructed photos. The artist used laser print to enlarge old photos and also rephotographed them with the present body. During this process, the artist sought to search for evidence of contact between her mother and herself in the acts of remembering or reconnecting or reconstructing their relations. Presented at the Third Asia-Pacific Triennial of Contemporary Art, September 1999, Queensland Art Gallery, Brisbane, Australia 
 Home Service (2003) - the artist enacted her services as a domestic worker to clean Singaporeans' homes. This work focused on the difficulties suffered by domestic workers in contemporary Singapore.
 Water is Politics (2003) - Heng performs with large basins of water and money, as part of an artists' residency in Sri Lanka. This work was a commentary on the recurrent tensions between Singapore and Malaysia with regards to water supply.
 Our Lives in Our Hands (2007) - this work underlined the social situation with the migration of thousands of foreign labourers who build the city but suffer bad living conditions, neglect by their employers and general Singaporean society.
 Singirl, Ongoing online project (from 2000 to the present) - consists of photographs of a Singapore Girl-outfitted Amanda, taken in various old Singaporean locations – old railway tracks, the Kampong Buangkok, the old Thieves' Market.

References

1951 births
Living people
LASALLE College of the Arts alumni
Feminist artists
Recipients of the Cultural Medallion for art
Singaporean art curators
Singaporean artists
Singaporean people of Teochew descent
Singaporean performance artists
Singaporean women artists